Misalliance is a play written in 1909–1910 by George Bernard Shaw. The play takes place entirely on a single Saturday afternoon in the conservatory of a large country house in Hindhead, Surrey in Edwardian era England.

It is a continuation of some of the ideas on marriage that he expressed in 1908 in his play, Getting Married. It was also a continuation of some of his other ideas on Socialism, physical fitness, the Life Force, and "The New Woman": i.e. women intent on escaping Victorian standards of helplessness, passivity, stuffy propriety, and non-involvement in politics or general affairs.

Shaw subtitled his play A Debate in One Sitting, and in the program of its first presentation in 1910 inserting this program note: "The debate takes place at the house of John Tarleton of Hindhead, Surrey, on 31 May 1909.  As the debate is a long one, the curtain will be lowered twice. The audience is requested to excuse these interruptions, which are made solely for its convenience."

The Irish playwright Lennox Robinson assisted Shaw when he was directing the original London production of the play.

Characters
John Tarleton, Junr.
Bentley Summerhays
Hypatia Tarleton
Mrs Tarleton
Lord Summerhays
John Tarleton
Joseph Percival
Lina Szczepanowska
Julius Baker

Plot
Misalliance is an ironic examination of the mating instincts of a varied group of people gathered at a wealthy man's country home on a summer weekend. Most of the romantic interest centers on the host's daughter, Hypatia Tarleton, a typical Shaw heroine who exemplifies his lifelong theory that in courtship, women are the relentless pursuers and men the apprehensively pursued.

Hypatia is the daughter of newly-wealthy John Tarleton who made his fortune in the unglamorous but lucrative underwear business.  She is fed up with the stuffy conventions that surround her and with the hyperactive talk of the men in her life.  Hypatia is engaged to Bentley Summerhays, an intellectually bright but physically and emotionally underdeveloped aristocrat.

Hypatia is restless with her engagement as the play starts, even as it is revealed she has also had a proposal of engagement from her betrothed's father, Lord Summerhays.   She has no desire to be a nurse to the elderly and is in no hurry to be made a widow.  She longs for some adventure to drop out of the sky, and it does ... an aircraft crashes through the roof of the conservatory to close the end of the first act.

At the beginning of Act II, it is revealed that the aircraft brings two unexpected guests. The pilot, Joey Percival, is a handsome young man who immediately arouses Hypatia's hunting instinct. The passenger, Lina Szczepanowska, is a female dare-devil of a circus acrobat whose vitality and directness inflame all the other men at the house-party.

An additional uninvited guest arrives in the form of Gunner.  He is a cashier who is very unhappy with his lot in life.  He blames the wealthy class in particular for the plight of the ordinary worker, and he blames John Tarleton in particular for a romantic dalliance that he once had with Gunner's mother.   Gunner arrives with intent to kill Tarleton but hides inside a piece of furniture.  From this position, he becomes wise to Hypatia's pursuit of Percival.  His character comes to introduce the themes of socialism to the play, as well as serving to question the conventional views on marriage and social order.

All together there are eight marriage proposals offered for consideration in the course of one summer afternoon. The question of whether any one of these combinations of marriage might be an auspicious alliance, or a misalliance, prompts one of the prospective husbands to utter the famous Shavian speculation: 
"If marriages were made by putting all the men's names into one sack and the women's names into another, and having them taken out by a blind-folded child like lottery numbers, there would be just as high a percentage of happy marriages as we have now."
	
Part of Shaw's premise is in the irony that men spend so much energy courting a woman who will be obedient and subservient to them, when what they really desire is a strong woman who will be their equal. Shaw's idea of such an "ideal woman", one present throughout his works, is embodied in this case by the character of Lina Szczepanowska. She is a death-defying Polish acrobat who accompanies Percival on his flight and subsequently becomes the object of affection for Summerhays, Tarleton, Bentley and Johnny. The affirmation of her role as Shaw's archetypical ideal woman is her  speech (the longest by far in the work) in which she rejects Johnny's offer of marriage in favor of retaining her independence...financially, intellectually and physically. She takes Bentley, who finds a shaky new courage, up into the air with her at the conclusion of the play.

Audio adaptations
The L.A. Theatre Works released an audio adaptation in 2004 with Roger Rees as Lord Summerhays, Eric Stoltz as Johnny Tarleton, Victoria Tennant as Mrs. Tarleton, W. Morgan Sheppard as Mr. Tarleton, Joy Gregory as Hypatia, Tom Beyer as Bentley Summerhays, Tegan West as Joey Percival, Douglas Weston as Gunner/Julius Baker and Serena Scott Thomas as Lina Szczepanowska.

References

External links

Download Misalliance from Project Gutenberg
 
 
Misalliance and Shaw
Shaw compared to Shakespeare
Review of Misalliance

1910 plays
Plays by George Bernard Shaw